Sir Charles Ashworth, KCB ( – 13 August 1832) was an English major-general, prominent in the Peninsular War.

Life
He was appointed ensign in the 68th foot in 1798 and lieutenant in 1799. He captain 55th foot in 1801, major 6th West India Regiment in 1808, and major 62nd foot in 1808. He was a lieutenant-colonel with the Portuguese army in 1810, and served as brigadier-general at the battles of Vittoria, Pyrenees, Nivelle, Nive, and St. Pierre, where he was badly wounded.

He took part in the combat of Buenza and succeeding engagements, for which he was honoured with a cross, and allowed, 14 November 1814, to accept the order of the Tower and Sword from the Prince Regent of Portugal. He attained the rank of colonel in 1814, and major-general in 1825; was nominated a companion of the Bath in 1815; and a knight commander on the occasion of the coronation of William IV in September 1831.

He died at Hall Place, St. John's Wood, on 13 August 1832, aged 48.

References

1832 deaths
1780s births
19th-century English people
Knights Commander of the Order of the Bath
68th Regiment of Foot officers
55th Regiment of Foot officers
West India Regiment officers
British Army major generals
British Army personnel of the Peninsular War